Kaku is a Japanese surname and a masculine Japanese given name. Notable people with the name include:

Surname:
 , American physicist
 , Taiwanese-born Japanese baseball player
 , Japanese actor
 , Japanese actor
 , Japanese manga artist

Given name:
 , Japanese Go player
 , Japanese actor

Japanese-language surnames
Japanese masculine given names